Siphusauctum is an extinct genus of filter-feeding animals that lived during the Middle Cambrian about 510 million years ago. Attached to the substrate by a holdfast, it had a tulip-shaped body, called the calyx, into which it actively pumped water that entered through pores and filtered out and digested organic contents.

Siphusauctum gregarium was described in 2012 from numerous fossils recovered from the "Tulip Beds" strata of the Burgess Shale of Yoho National Park, British Columbia, Canada. The specific epithet comes from Latin  ("flock" or "herd") referring to the large numbers of specimens recovered. It is the only species classified under the genus Siphusauctum and the family Siphusauctidae. The seeming presence of a digestive tract and anus suggest that it is a member of Bilateria, but it cannot be assigned to any subgroup with confidence.

In 2017 a new species, Siphusauctum lloydguntheri, was reported from the Middle Cambrian Spence Shale of Utah.

References

Burgess Shale fossils
†Siphusauctum
Prehistoric bilaterian genera

Cambrian genus extinctions